Dan Meyer (born April 7, 1957) is an American sword swallower, multiple Guinness World record holder in sword swallowing, a global TEDx speaker, and the recipient of the 2007 Ig Nobel Prize in Medicine. Meyer was one among the Top 50 finalists on America's Got Talent Season 3 (2008), and returned to compete on America's Got Talent Season 11 (2016), on France's Got Talent Season 12 (2017), and Israel's Got Talent International Edition Season 2 (2018–19), Sweden Got Talent (2023). He is the president of Sword Swallowers Association International (SSAI). Meyer has also made many other television and film appearances.
</ref>

Awards and honors
 Guinness World Record for Most Sword Swallowers Swallowing Swords Simultaneously
 Most Swords Swallowed Simultaneously
 Guinness World Record for Single Sword Swallowed by the Most Sword Swallowers
 Most Swords Swallowed Simultaneously by Sword Swallowers
 Guinness World Record for Sword Swallowing Underwater - 21 inch sword with 18 inch long blade
 Guinness World Record for Sword Swallowing Underwater - 30 inch sword with 24 inch long blade
 Guinness World Record for Most Swords Swallowed Simultaneously Underwater: 2 swords
 Ripley's Believe It or Not! Myrtle Beach - Sword swallowing underwater in tank of sharks 
 2007 Ig Nobel Prize in Medicine at Harvard

References

External links

1957 births
Living people
Sword swallowers
America's Got Talent contestants
People from Michigan City, Indiana